Martin Selig (born 1936/37) is a German-born American billionaire property developer, particularly known for his work in Seattle including the Columbia Center, the city's tallest building. He is a Holocaust survivor, having been able to go into hiding from the Nazis and then immigrate with his family to the US.

Early life
Martin Selig was born to a Jewish family in Germany, the son of Manfred Selig (1902-1992), who was born in Buchen, Germany, the son of a horse-trader. In 1939 Manfred was warned by a neighbour "that the Nazis had labeled him an undesirable". He, his wife, and two children left quickly. The next day the Nazis confiscated his home and business. The family hid in warehouses in Frankfurt, before heading eastwards via Poland, Russia, Korea and Japan. They boarded a steamer to San Francisco, but chose Seattle "on a whim" because the boat stopped there and the sun was shining.

In Seattle, Manfred opened "Selig's Linen Shop", started a children's clothing business, and was an art collector.

Career

Selig worked for his father in his children's clothing store before building his first shopping center in 1962. His plan to build a 48-story building in Belltown in 1979 was cancelled after protests from residents of the existing Devonshire Apartments, a low-income housing property on the site.

Since then, he has built mostly tall buildings in Seattle, including two blocks on Fifth Avenue known as Fifth & Jackson and Fifth & Yesler, and by the 1980s owned nearly one-third of Seattle's office space, with Forbes estimating his 1987 net worth at US$270 million. He built the Columbia Center in 1985, still the city's tallest building, and sold it in 1989 for $354 million.

In August 2015, it was reported that he had submitted plans to build a 31-story tower on top of the 1950s Federal Reserve Bank Building on 2nd Avenue. He bought the building in a government auction for $16 million earlier in 2015. The two buildings will be separated by what he describes as a 36-foot high "winter garden".

In October 2015, Martin Selig Real Estate owned 4 million square feet of office space in Seattle, and his estimated net worth was $1.1 billion. The firm has been criticized for being delinquent on paying electricity bills to Seattle City Light in 2006 and 2016, the latter totaling $1.9 million before being paid.

Projects

Columbia Center (owned until 1989): tallest building in Seattle since completion
1000 Second Avenue: company headquarters
Fifth & Yesler Building
Fifth & Jackson Building
1015 Second Avenue, at the site of Federal Reserve Bank Building
Third and Lenora (planned to open in 2020)

Personal life
He is an art collector, paints himself, and owns works by Rembrandt and Toulouse-Lautrec.

He was married to Andrea Selig; they divorced in 1995. They have three children: David, Lauren and Jordan. Selig has since remarried to artist Catherine Mayer.

His daughter, Lauren Selig, a Hollywood executive producer, is the widow of Russian-born American Kyril Faenov, head of Microsoft's High Performance Computing Lab, until his suicide in 2012.

Political views

Selig is a Republican and donates to political causes. He endorsed and planned a fundraiser for Donald Trump in the 2016 presidential election, but later withdrew his support. He later donated the maximum personal amount to Trump's 2020 re-election campaign.

References

1930s births
Living people
American billionaires
Jewish American art collectors
Jewish emigrants from Nazi Germany to the United States
American real estate businesspeople
Businesspeople from Seattle